Stadionul Central is a multi-use stadium in Recea, Romania. It is used mostly for football matches and is the home ground of Academica Recea and Independența Baia Mare. The stadium was opened on 9 May 2018, having a covered stand of 600 seats, a pitch covered with grass and a second training ground. The total cost of the construction was amount €300,000.

References

Football venues in Romania
Sport in Maramureș County
Buildings and structures in Maramureș County